Brew Your Own is an American magazine, particularly concerned with the process of homebrewing beer.   The magazine is published eight times annually from offices in Manchester Village, Vermont.  Brew Your Own was launched in 1995 and is the largest circulation magazine for people interested in making their own beer at home.  Subject matter covered in each issue includes beer recipes, how-to projects and advice columns.

Brew Your Owns sister publication is WineMaker magazine.

References

External links
Official Site

Alcohol in the United States
Beer journalism
Eight times annually magazines published in the United States
Food and drink magazines
Hobby magazines published in the United States
Homebrewing
Magazines established in 1995
Magazines published in Vermont
1995 establishments in Vermont